The 1996 City of Imola motorcycle Grand Prix was the twelfth round of the 1996 Grand Prix motorcycle racing season. It took place on 1 September 1996 at the Autodromo Enzo e Dino Ferrari.

500 cc classification

250 cc classification

125 cc classification

References

City of Imola motorcycle Grand Prix
City of Imola
City of Imola Motorcycle Grand Prix